Acleris coniferarum is a species of moth of the family Tortricidae. It is found in Kazakhstan.

The larvae feed on Abies species and Picea schrenckiana.

References

Moths described in 1962
coniferarum
Moths of Asia